Ta Prota Hronia  (Greek: τις πρώτες φορές) is a compilation album by the popular Greek artist Peggy Zina. It was released in 2005 by Sony BMG Greece and includes the songs of her first two albums: Peggy Zina and Anevaines, which are part of the BMG Greece back catalogue.

Track listing
"M'Ena Pseftiko Sougia" - 4:21
"Anevaines" - 3:18
"Sinnefiasmeni Kyriaki" - 4:26
"Psihi Mou Moni" - 3:19
"Den Eimai Tipota" - 2:59
"O Kaliteros Tropos" - 3:35
"Leme Leme" - 3:08
"Me Parakoloutheis" - 3:44
"Dikeologies" - 3:18
"Apomonothikes" - 3:13
"Μythos" - 3:17
"Alkionides Meres" - 4:27
"Den Boro Na Filiso Kanena" (Opos Filo Esena) - 3:17
"Mas Ta' Pan Ki Alli" - 3:05
"An Pas Me Alli" - 3:29
"Kai Kartero" - 3:59
"Kratise Me" - 3:34
"Hanomai" - 3:00
"Anisyho" - 3:52
"De Thelo Kouventes" - 3:30
"Prospoieisai" - 4:20
"Gyrises" - 4:01

Chart performance

References

Greek-language albums
Peggy Zina compilation albums
2005 compilation albums
Sony Music Greece compilation albums